Jin Xiang (20 April 1935 – 23 December 2015) was a Chinese composer and conductor. He studied composition at the China Central Conservatory under Chen Peixun. In 1959 he received his Bachelor of Arts in Composition. Soon after, he was labelled a rightist and sent to work in Tibet leading a folk music local ensemble, and then on to Ürümqi in Xinjiang for twenty years doing farm labor. After the Cultural Revolution he returned to Beijing and was conductor and composer in residence of the Beijing Symphony Orchestra from 1979–1984. Jin Xiang came to the United States in 1988 and was a visiting scholar at the Juilliard School in 1998 and the University of Washington and the composer-in-residence at the Washington National Opera. From 1994-1995 he was the Art Director of the China Performing Administration Centre of the Ministry of Culture. In 1996, he founded and was the president of the East-West Music Exchange Association, a non-profit that promoted the exchange of eastern and western music.

He died on 23 December 2015, aged 80.

Works

Operas
A Warm Breeze Outside 1980.
The Savage Land (《原野》yuanye)  1987 after Cao Yu's 1937 play The Wilderness
The King of Chu (《楚霸王》) 1994.
Native Fatal Woman 1996. 
Beautiful Warrior 2001. Written with Barbara Zinn Krieger.
Taxiwayi — The Beloved Troubadour 2003.
Yang Guifei 2004.
Eight Women Jump Into the River 2005.
Sunrise 1990, 2015.

Chamber, vocal, and solo compositions
Four Seasons Songs of Zi-Ye 1981.
An Album of Chinese Painting: Pine, Bamboo, Plum 1985.
String Quartet No. 1 1990.
Chamber Concerto for 14 Instruments 1991.
The Shape and the Spirit 1991.
The Cooling Moon 1995.
Si 1995.
Nanjing Lament 1997.
A Desert Ship 1998.
Instant 1998.
Sacrificing to Heaven 1999.
Chinese Calligraphy 1999.
Bloody Azaleas 2000.
The cuckoo crying blood 2000.
From Ancient Style Into New Metre 2000.
Song of the New Century 2000.
The Cold Water of Yi River 2001.
The Reticent Orchid 2001.
Blood Over The Mountain 2003.
Midnight Dialogue 2005.

Television and film scores
Fascinating Band
Hut in Moonlight
The Stars are Sparkling Tonight

Choral compositions
Song of Green 1999.
Hello, Forest 1999.
Songhua River (Arrangement) 2001.
Yunnan 2001.

Orchestral compositions
Taxiwayi 1978.
Snow Lotus 1982.
Illusion 1983.
Five Songs from Shi-Jin Book 1985.
A Glimpse of Taklamagan Desert 1987.
Cao Xiu-Qing 1989.The Dream of Red Mansions 1989.Nu-Wa 1989.Asking the Sky 1993.Ming 1994.Se 1994.So 1995.Hero of the Huge Desert 1996.Flower Season 1996.New Beginning Sounds 1996.Symphonic Overture 1997 1996.Wu: A Symphonietta 1997.Spring 1998."Oh Macao, My Macao" 1999.The Love of Dragon and Phoenix 2000.Li Sao 2005.Nanjing Lament'' 2005.

References

1935 births
2015 deaths
20th-century classical composers
21st-century classical composers
Central Conservatory of Music alumni
Chinese classical composers
Chinese male classical composers
Chinese opera composers
Male opera composers
Musicians from Shaoxing
People from Zhuji
20th-century male musicians
21st-century male musicians